The Virginia Outdoors Foundation is a quasi-state agency formed by the Virginia General Assembly in 1966 "to promote the preservation of open space lands and to encourage private gifts of money, securities, land or other property to preserve the natural, scenic, historic, open-space and recreational areas of the Commonwealth."

Members of the Virginia Outdoors Foundation's Board of Trustees are appointed by the Virginia governor for four-year staggered terms. The sitting governor appoints a chairman from among the seven trustees.

In cooperation with the Virginia Department of Game and Inland Fisheries, the Virginia Outdoors Foundation also helps manage the  Smith Mountain Cooperative Wildlife Management Area, established via easement on land owned by Appalachian Power along Smith Mountain Lake.

As of 2008, twenty percent of the land in Clarke County, Virginia was covered by conservation easements.

References

External links
Virginia Outdoors Foundation

Government of Virginia
Environment of Virginia